Nikolay Grigoryevich Erschoff, also Nikolaj Grigor'jevitsch Erschov, Erschow or Yershov (23 April 1837 in Moscow – 12 March 1896 in Saint Petersburg) was a Russian entomologist mainly interested in Lepidoptera.

Selected works
1868. Für die St.-Petersburger Fauna neue Schmetterlinge. Тр. Рус. энтомол. о-ва, т. 5, с. 97–99.
1872. Diagnoses de quelques especes nouvelles de Lépidoptères appartenant a la faune de la Russie Asiatique. Horae Societatis Entomologicae Rossicae. 8: 315–318.
as Erschow, N.G. 1874. Lepidopteren von Turkestan. Stettiner Entomologische Zeitung, 35: 386–417.
1877. Diagnosen neuer Lepidopteren aus den verschiedenen Provinzen des Russischen Reiches. Horae Societatis Entomologicae Rossicae 12: 336–348.
1885. Verzeichniss von Schmetterlingen aus Central Sibirien. Mémoires sur les Lépidoptères, 2: 208–211.
1892. Verzeichniss von Schmetterlingen aus Central Sibirien. Mémoires sur les Lépidoptères, VI: 670–672, pl. XVI.

Collection
Erschoff's insect collection is in the Zoological Collection of the Russian Academy of Science.

References

Russian lepidopterists
1837 births
1896 deaths
Biologists from the Russian Empire
19th-century scientists from the Russian Empire
Scientists from Moscow